The Langley Rivermen are a junior "A" ice hockey team based in Langley, British Columbia, Canada. They are members of the Mainland Division of the British Columbia Hockey League (BCHL).

History
The BCHL franchise was founded as the Richmond Sockeyes in 1972 in the Pacific Junior A Hockey League. In 1990, Sockeyes dropped to the junior B level and sold the junior A franchise to become the Chilliwack Chiefs. In 2006, the Chilliwack Bruins of the Western Hockey League were founded and the Chiefs moved to become the Langley Chiefs.

In 2011, the Chiefs changed ownership and became the Langley Rivermen, allowing for the return of the Chiefs to Chilliwack.

Season-by-season record
Note: GP = Games played, W = Wins, L = Losses, T = Ties, OTL = Overtime Losses, Pts = Points, GF = Goals for, GA = Goals against, PIM = Penalties in minutes

Notable Langley Chiefs/Rivermen alumni

See also
 List of ice hockey teams in British Columbia

References

External links
 Langley Rivermen website

British Columbia Hockey League teams
Langley, British Columbia (district municipality)
Ice hockey teams in Vancouver
Ice hockey teams in British Columbia
2011 establishments in British Columbia
Ice hockey clubs established in 2011